Uppada Beach is located near Kakinada in Kakinada district of the Indian state of Andhra Pradesh. APTDC undertakes the developmental activities in order to promote tourism.

Cyclone effects 
After the beach was eroded by Cyclone Helen in 2013, a retaining wall was built to protect from future damage.

References 

Beaches of Andhra Pradesh
Geography of East Godavari district